Manuel Carrión Rodríguez (born 19 July 1978 in Ibi, Alcoià, Valencian Community) is a Spanish footballer who plays for UD Rayo Ibense as a left back.

External links

1978 births
Living people
People from Alcoià
Sportspeople from the Province of Alicante
Spanish footballers
Footballers from the Valencian Community
Association football defenders
Segunda División players
Segunda División B players
Tercera División players
Divisiones Regionales de Fútbol players
CD Alcoyano footballers
Ontinyent CF players
Orihuela CF players